The Great Balsam Mountains, or Balsam Mountains, are in the mountain region of western North Carolina, United States. The Great Balsams are a subrange of the Blue Ridge Mountains, which in turn are a part of the Appalachian Mountains. The most famous peak in the Great Balsam range is Cold Mountain, which is the centerpiece of author Charles Frazier's bestselling novel Cold Mountain.

The Blue Ridge Parkway runs along its length and at Richland Balsam (milepost 431), the Parkway is at its highest point (6053 feet).

Peaks

 Richland Balsam – 6410 feet
 Black Balsam Knob – 6214  feet
 Mount Hardy – 6120  feet
 Reinhart Knob – 6080  feet
 Grassy Cove Top – 6040  feet
 Tennent Mountain – 6040 feet
 Sam Knob – 6040 feet
 Cold Mountain – 6030  feet
 Shining Rock – 6040 feet
 Chestnut Bald
()

Other landmarks
 Balsam Gap
 Devil's Courthouse
 Judaculla Rock (see Tsul 'Kalu; photos)
 Tanasee Bald (see Tsul 'Kalu)

Flora
The area consists of a transition forest between the southern Appalachian spruce–fir forest (which resembles forest types found at northern latitudes) and the mixed deciduous forests of temperate America.

Trees
The following trees are at higher elevations:
 Fraser fir ("balsams" or "She balsams"). Forests of these trees appear black from a distance; however, these trees are declining due to the balsam woolly adelgid.
 Red spruce ("He balsams"). The red spruce is distinguished from the Fraser fir by having bark whose rosin cannot be milked (hence, "He balsams") and by having hanging cones.

Shrubs
 Catawba rhododendron
 Flame azalea
 Mountain laurel

See also
List of mountains in North Carolina

Sources

Mountain ranges of North Carolina
Mountains, Great Balsam
Blue Ridge Mountains
Landforms of Haywood County, North Carolina
Landforms of Jackson County, North Carolina